Tilby is an English surname. It was first found in Essex at Tilbury, a town in the borough of Thurrock.

People
Notable people with the surname include:

Angela Tilby (born 1950), English author and Anglican priest
Trish Tilby, American fictional cartoon character
Wendy Tilby (born 1960), Canadian animator
A. Wyatt Tilby (1880–1948), English author, journalist and traveller 

English-language surnames